Jamghan (also Romanized as Jāmghān and Jā Moghān; also known as Chāmqān, Jamoqān, and Jāmqān) is a village in Jolgah Rural District, in the Central District of Jahrom County, Fars Province, Iran. At the 2016 census, its population was 67.

References 

Populated places in Jahrom County